The Tioughnioga River is a  tributary of the Chenango River in central New York in the United States. It drains a dissected plateau area east of the Finger Lakes at the northernmost edge of the watershed of the Susquehanna River.

The name comes from a native word for "forks of the river" or "meeting of waters".  The river was also called "Tiohujodha" by the Moravian Indians.  At one time it was called the Onondaga, as leading to that town, and Teyoghagoga was another early form.

It rises in two branches in upstate New York southeast of the city of Syracuse, with the East Branch sometimes regarded as the main branch.

The Tully Valley is a preglacial valley of a northward flowing river that flowed into the Ontarian River (preglacial Lake Ontario). Near Tully, during the glacial retreat, the valley was dammed by ice to form a lake. For a period of time the retreating of the front by melting matched the forward movement of the glacier, so that the captured rock, gravel and sand was deposited into the lake. This huge quantity of material approximately half filled the valley, and reversed the flow direction to the southward. It left enormous quantities of gravel from Tully to Cortland, some of which was used as building material for Interstate 81. The gravel also forms a major aquifer for the area. Tully Lake is a glacial kettle, being formed by a large chunk of ice that was buried in the glacial debris. As the ice melted the land collapsed, causing a lake to form.

The East Branch flows southwest, receiving the West Branch at Cortland.

The Tioughnioga River then flows south-southeast, receiving the Otselic River from the northeast at Whitney Point.

Tributaries
 Halfway Brook
 Whitney Point Lake
 Jennings Creek
 Trout Brook
 West Branch Tioughnioga River
 Factory Brook
 East Branch Tioughnioga River
 Cheningo Creek
 Fabius Brook
 Carpenter Creek
 West Branch Tioughnioga Creek
 Tioughnioga Creek
 Middle Branch Tioughnioga Creek
 East Branch Tioughnioga Creek

See also
List of New York rivers

References

External links

Tributaries of the Susquehanna River
Rivers of New York (state)
Rivers of Broome County, New York
Rivers of Chenango County, New York
Rivers of Cortland County, New York
Rivers of Madison County, New York
Rivers of Onondaga County, New York